The Excellent Order of the Islamic Republic is Iran's state decoration of honour, established by "Council of Iran Ministers" on November 21, 1990.  According to Article 5 of the Regulations on the Awarding of Government Orders of Iran, the Order of the Islamic Republic is awarded by the President of Iran to the heads and other officials of foreign countries, the highest executive of international organizations, or to prominent cultural, political, international characters recognized in any of the following respects:
 The exaltation of the word Islam and the spread of the intellectual foundations of the Islamic Revolution
 Defending the rights of the world's oppressed peoples
 Act to liberate their country from cultural, economic and political colonization
 Protect and preservation of their country from the aggression of superpowers or their subordinates
 Acquisition of fundamental freedoms and human rights for the people of their country
 Sensitive and appropriate support for Iran's positions on major international scenes
 Taking anti-arrogant stances
 Sincerely cooperate in establishing or developing healthy relations between the Islamic Republic of Iran and the country of in charge character
 Continuously striving for peace and security and comfort in the world

Recipients

Classes 
According to Article 6 of the Regulations on the Awarding of Government Orders of Iran, The Order of the Islamic Republic has three classes, which upon the recommendation of the Minister of Foreign Affairs and endorsed by the Cabinet, are awarded to the following qualified persons:
 First Order: Presidents and prime ministers and aligning characters
 Second Order: Ministers and aligning characters
 Third Order: Ambassadors and aligning characters

See also 
 Order of Islamic Revolution
 Order of Independence (Iran)
 Order of Freedom (Iran)

References

External links 
 Iran Awarding of Government Orders website
 Types of Iran's Orders and their benefits (Persian)

CS1 uses Persian-language script (fa)
Awards established in 1990
Civil awards and decorations of Iran
1990 establishments in Iran
Foreign relations of Iran